Ana Starck-Stănișel (née Starck; born 28 January 1935), also known as Ana Stark-Stănișel or as Anna Stark-Stănișel, is a Romanian former handballer who played for the Romanian national team.

Trophies 
Liga Națională:
Winner: 1961, 1962, 1963, 1967

Cupa României:
Winner: 1956, 1961

European Champions Cup:
Winner: 1964 

World Championship:
Gold Medalist: 1956, 1960, 1962 

Carpathian Trophy:
Winner: 1960, 1961, 1962, 1963, 1966, 1967

References

 
 
1935 births
Living people
Sportspeople from Bucharest
Romanian female handball players 
Expatriate handball players 
Romanian expatriate sportspeople in Germany
Romanian people of German descent